Nicola Tagliacozzi Canale (Naples, 1691 – Naples, 1764) was an Italian architect, engineer, engraver, and scenic designer of the Rococo period in Naples, Italy. He was influenced by his contemporaries Domenico Antonio Vaccaro and Ferdinando Sanfelice.

References

External link

1691 births
1764 deaths
18th-century Italian architects
Architects from Naples